David Jan Novotný (born 1947) is a Czech novelist, scriptwriter and professor of dramaturgy.

Life and career
Novotný was born in Prague. After finishing school, he had various jobs, including work as a cleaner in the theatre, assistant production manager and assistant camera operator at Short Film Prague, and assistant production manager at Barrandov Studios. He completed his military service in 1968-1970, and in 1970-1971 worked at a printing house.

In 1971-1976 he studied at the Film and TV School of The Academy of Performing Arts in Prague (FAMU), in the department of screenwriting and dramaturgy. In 1977-1990 he was a scriptwriter at Barrandov Studios. In 1990 he became a member of the Czech writers community and the Czech Film and TV Union, and became an assistant in the FAMU Department of Scriptwriting and Dramaturgy, and worked as a class teacher. In 1997 he received his higher doctorate, and an associate professorship. He also became Vice-Dean for science and pedagogical affairs, joined the Scientific council of FAMU, and became deputy chairman of the council for PhD study.

In 1997 he received his habilitation in the disciplines of dramaturgy and scriptwriting. In 2001 he was made Professor of Scriptwriting and Dramaturgy, and in 2002 was nominated for a professorship at department of Journalism at Charles University. From 2000 to 2004 he was Professor of Cinema Studies in the foreign students program at FAMU. In 2004-2007 he was Rector of the Film Academy of Miroslav Ondříček in Písek. He is currently Professor at Literary Academy of Josef Škvorecký, in Prague, and a dramaturge and script adviser in the production company ArtForum21.

He is father to the Swedish actress Tuva Novotny.

References

External links
Film Academy of Miroslav Ondříček in Písek

Czech novelists
Male novelists
Czech male writers
Czech screenwriters
Male screenwriters
Living people
1947 births
Writers from Prague
Academy of Performing Arts in Prague alumni